The India men's national football team's and the India women's national football team will be competing in the 2012 Nehru Cup and 2012 AFC U-16 Championship for the men and the 2012 SAFF Women's Championship for the women. The men are coached by Dutchmen Wim Koevermans while the women are coached by Anadi Barua.

Men

Record

Goalscorer's

Fixtures & Results

2014 AFC Challenge Cup qualification

2012 Nehru Cup

International Friendlies

FIFA and AFC Ranking

Tournaments

Senior

Women

Record

Goalscorer's

Fixtures & Results

2014 AFC Women's Asian Cup qualification

2012 SAFF Women's Championship

Friendlies

FIFA and AFC Ranking

Tournaments

Senior

See also
 2012–13 in Indian football
 Football in India

Notes

India national football team results
2012–13 in Indian football